Bekal Fort railway station is an important railway station in Kasaragod district which serves thousands of people per day. It comes under the Southern Railway zone of Indian Railways. Bekal Fort railway station handles around 10 trains and serves about 5000 of people per day. It is situated next to the Bekal Fort Beach and near to the Bekal Fort. The older name of this railway station was Pallikkere railway station. But later, it was named after the Bekal Fort as 'Bekal Fort Railway Station'. The Indian Railways has about 13 acres of land in the surrounding of the Bekal Fort railway station.

References 

Railway stations in Kasaragod district
Palakkad railway division
Kanhangad area